The 14th Army Corps was an Army corps in the Imperial Russian Army.

Composition
18th Infantry Division
13th Cavalry Division
14th Cavalry Division

Part of
4th Army: 1914
9th Army: 1914
4th Army: 1914 - 1915
3rd Army: 1915
1st Army: 1916
5th Army: 1916
1st Army: 1916 - 1917
5th Army: 1917

External links
 Russian Army, 1914

Corps of the Russian Empire